The Benin national under-17 football team represents Benin at under-17 association football youth international matches.

In September 2018 they were disqualified from the WAFU U-17 Championship, and in October 2018 10 players were jailed, due to age fraud.

References

under-17
Benin